The 2020 Washington Republican presidential primary took place on March 10, 2020, as one of 5 contests scheduled for that day in the Republican Party primaries for the 2020 presidential election.

Results

Results by county

See also
 2020 Washington Democratic presidential primary

References

Republican primary
Washington
Washington Republican primary
2020